The Vecchio is a river in the department of Haute-Corse, Corsica, France. It is a tributary of the river Tavignano.

Course

It crosses the communes of Muracciole, Noceta, Venaco and Vivario.

The Vecchio rises to the north of the  Punta dell'Oriente in the commune of Vivario.
Its upper section is called the Ruisseau de Fulminato.
It runs north or north-northeast through the Foret de Vizzavona past the village of Vizzavona to a point south of Santo-Pietro-di-Venaco where it turns to the east and flows to the Tavignano.
For most of its upper course it is followed by the T20 road.
After it turns east it is followed by the D143 road.

Bridges

The viaduct over the Vecchio, or Eiffel bridge, in the commune of Vivario was built between 1891 and 1893 by Gustave Eiffel.
It is a metal railway viaduct with three interdependent spans, running between abutments hollowed out by double arches and supported by two piers. 
The work was undertaken by the contractor Vignolle.
The bridge was classified as a Monument historique on 29 July 1976.

The viaduct runs above the old road bridge on a loop of the RN 193 between Venaco and Vivario, built between 1826 and 1827. 
It was replaced by a new bridge in 1999 and is now only used by cyclists and pedestrians.
The new bridge on the RN 193 is downstream from the old bridge, built between 1996 and 1999.
Other bridges are:
The Ajiunta bridge on the RT50, near the confluence of the Vecchio with the Tavignano, built in 2011-2012 to replace the old single-lane bridge.
The Mulinello bridge in the town of Vivario on the D23 leading to the hamlet of Canaglia
The Forest trail bridge in Vizzavona Forest, on the archaeological trail to the Southwell Vault.

Hydrology

Measurements of the river flow were taken at the Venaco [Pont de Noceta] station from 1960 to 2021.

Tributaries
The following streams (ruisseaux) are tributaries of the Vecchio, ordered by length, and sub-tributaries:

 Manganello 
 Meli 
 Giargialiccia 
 Grottacia 
 Mazzola 
 Busso 
 Pantanelle 
 Scalelli 
 Verjello 
 Querceto 
 Ondella 
 Petra Rotta 
 Agnone river 
 Tineta 
 Forcaticcio 
 Larice 
 Cardiglione 
 Quarcigrosso 
 Piobico 
 Monte Grosso 
 Granaja 
 Speloncello 
 Basse di Speloncello 
 Omenino 
 Rio Secco 
 Spelonca 
 Chiarasola 
 Bagliacone 
 Gradule 
 Rossi 
 Avalanche de Fulminato 
 Ferletto

Notes

Sources

Rivers of Haute-Corse
Rivers of France